Alvin Kent Washington (born September 25, 1958) is a former American football linebacker in the National Football League (NFL). Washington was drafted in the fourth round of the 1981 NFL Draft by the New York Jets out of Ohio State University.

References

External links
 
 Bio from 1981 Jets yearbook

1958 births
Living people
American football linebackers
New York Jets players
Ottawa Rough Riders players
Ohio State Buckeyes football players
Sportspeople from Erie, Pennsylvania
Players of American football from Cleveland